Edward Harcourt may refer to:
 Edward Venables-Vernon-Harcourt (1757–1847), Bishop of Carlisle and Archbishop of York
 Ed Harcourt (born 1977), British singer-songwriter
 Edward Harcourt (philosopher), British philosopher
 Edward Vernon Harcourt (1825–1891), English politician, traveller and amateur ornithologist
 Eduard Harkort (1797–1836), German-born colonel in the Texas Revolution